Beresina, or the Last Days of Switzerland is a 1999 satiric comedy film by Swiss director Daniel Schmid. It chronicles the story of Irina, a Russian call girl arriving in Switzerland, whose innocent attempt to live the high life there triggers an unintended coup d'état in the country. The title Beresina refers to the  Beresinalied, a patriotic song used as the code for initiating the putsch.

The film is a black comedy where all aspects of Swiss life are satirized in anecdotes. The heroine deals with a retired P-26 officer who appears as her false "sponsor" and various sexual perverts at the top of Swiss social hierarchy. Their attitudes to immigrants are also depicted ironically. Even the national identity and modern history of Switzerland are caricaturized in the country's first ever coup d'état sequences. The film culminates with Irina's coronation as Queen of Switzerland.

Beresina was screened in the Un Certain Regard section at the 1999 Cannes Film Festival.

Cast

Reception
The film was praised by Variety, where Schmid "applies his wicked sense of humour", to create a "rollicking socio-political farce that roasts just about everyone in power." The review also explained how Schmid uses "black humour to expose Swiss high society as a hypocritical facade hiding secrets from money-laundering to pimping, with the banks involved in absolutely everything."

References

External links
 
 

Austrian comedy films
Swiss comedy films
1999 films
German comedy films
1990s German-language films
1999 comedy films
Films directed by Daniel Schmid
Films set in Switzerland
1990s German films